Cameraria jacintoensis is a moth of the family Gracillariidae. It is known from California, United States.

The length of the forewings is 2.8-4.5 mm.

The larvae feed on Quercus kelloggii, Quercus dumosa, Quercus dumosa var. turbinella, Quercus dumosa × turbinella californica and Quercus turbinella. They mine the leaves of their host plant. The mine is ovoid. The epidermis is opaque, green tan. Mines normally cross the midrib and consume 25%-100% of the leaf surface. The mines are solitary and normally with two parallel folds, but rarely one or three.

Etymology
The specific name is derived from the type-locality (Mount San Jacinto) and the Latin suffix -ensis (denoting place, locality).

References

Cameraria (moth)

Moths of North America
Lepidoptera of the United States
Leaf miners
Moths described in 1981
Fauna of California
Taxa named by Paul A. Opler
Taxa named by Donald R. Davis (entomologist)